The Australian Taxation Office (ATO) is an Australian statutory agency and the principal revenue collection body for the Australian Government. The ATO has responsibility for administering the Australian federal taxation system, superannuation legislation, and other associated matters. Responsibility for the operations of the ATO are within the portfolio of the Treasurer of Australia and the Treasury.

As the Australian government's principal revenue collection body, the ATO collects income tax, goods and services tax (GST) and other federal taxes. The ATO also has responsibility for managing the Australian Business Register, delivering the Higher Education Loan Program, delivering many Australian government payments and administering key components of Australia's superannuation system.

History

During the colonial period of the 1800s, a number of landholders had secured large tracts of arable land in Australia. After the states federated in 1901 to form the Commonwealth of Australia, the Commonwealth's main source of revenue was derived from indirect customs and the excise on duties on locally manufactured and imported goods. The Labor Andrew Fisher government was elected at the 1910 federal election and was concerned about large swathes of the country being under-utilised. The government introduced the first federal tax laws – the Bank Notes Tax Act 1910, the Land Tax Act 1910 and the Land Tax Assessment Act 1910 – to break up the large estates.

George McKay was appointed the first Commissioner of Land Taxation on 11 November 1910. The first tax return forms were issued on 10 January 1911 so that landholders could be assessed for their land tax liabilities. The tax was not popular, but a High Court of Australia challenge to the land tax found the law to be constitutional. The associated land valuations were contentious with more than 1,800 appeals and objections received by the middle of 1913.

In his first year, commissioner McKay had underneath him 105 tax officers, assessed approximately 15,000 land tax returns and collected £1.3 million to £1.4 million. Over the next decade, the government introduced several new taxes, mainly to cope with the massive cost of Australia's collecting revenue to fund participation in World War I. By the end of the decade, the department employed 1,565 people and collected approximately £10.45 million in taxes.

According to its 2013–14 Annual Plan, the ATO employs an average of 22,022 people. In the 2012–13 financial year, the ATO collected revenues totalling $313.082 billion in individual income tax, company income tax, goods and services (GST) tax, excise and others.

Former employee Richard Boyle has alleged that there was a culture within the ATO to increase the use of garnishee notices, which allow the ATO to access funds in the bank accounts of taxpayers.  This was investigated by the Inspector-General of taxation, Ali Noroozi. Noroozi's findings included concerns that small businesses were not given enough time to react to a garnishee notice before having their funds seized. The ATO was criticized for attempting to suppress Boyle's revelations with a non-disclosure agreement and accusing him of 66 offences related to breach of privacy.

The ATO was the first Australian Government agency to introduce a virtual assistant using artificial intelligence on its website (see Artificial intelligence in government).

Commissioner
Chris Jordan was appointed Commissioner of Taxation and Registrar of the Australian Business Register on 1 January 2013.

The Australian Taxation Office has been headed by twelve Commissioners of Taxation:

 George McKay – 1910–16
Robert Ewing – 1917–39
 Lawrence Jackson – 1939–46
 Patrick McGovern – 1946–61
 John O'Sullivan – 1961–63
 Daniel Canavan – 1963–64
 Edward Cain – 1964–76
 William (Bill) O'Reilly – 1976–84
 Trevor Boucher – 1984–93
Michael Carmody – 1993–2005
Michael D'Ascenzo – 2005–12
 Chris Jordan – 2013–present

Organisational structure
The Commissioner of Taxation is responsible for the general administration of the tax system and the ATO. The Commissioner of Taxation and three Second Commissioners of Taxation are each appointed for a term of seven years. The Commissioner and Second Commissioners are eligible for re-appointment after each term. The current Commissioner of Taxation is Chris Jordan (appointed in January 2013), the previous Commissioner was Michael D'Ascenzo.

The overall strategic direction of the organisation is set by the ATO Executive Committee, which is composed of the Commissioner, three Second Commissioners, Chief Operating Officer, Chief Service Delivery Officer, and Chief Finance Officer. These roles are currently held by;

 Chris Jordan, Commissioner of Taxation and Registrar of the Australian Business Registry
 Jeremy Hirschhorn, Second Commissioner
 Deb Jenkins, Second Commissioner
 Ramez Katf, Second Commissioner and Chief Information Officer
 Jacqui Curtis, Chief Operating Officer
 Melinda Smith, Chief Service Delivery Officer
 Janine Bristow, Chief Finance Officer

Furthermore, the ATO's operations are managed through five groups which are led by members of the executive. These groups are:
 Client Engagement, led by Second Commissioner Jeremy Hirschhorn.
 Law Design and Practice, led by Second Commissioner Deb Jenkins.
 Service Delivery and Business Reporting and Registrations, led by Chief Service Delivery Officer Melinda Smith.
 Enterprise Solutions and Technology, led by Second Commissioner and Chief Information Officer Ramez Katf.
 Enterprise Strategy and Corporate Operations, led by Chief Operating Officer Jacqui Curtis.

Groups are further divided into business and service lines (BSLs) which are responsible for the delivery of group priorities.

Performance
The Commissioner of Taxation is required to prepare and release an annual report each financial year. The annual report outlines the ATO's performance and achievements for each financial year.

Table 1.1 ATO net tax collections 2008–09 FY to 2012–13 FY (in $m)

Legislation
Income Tax Assessment Act 1936
Income Tax Assessment Act 1997

See also

 Business activity statement
 List of Australian government entities
 Tax file number
 TaxPack

References

External links
  Australian Taxation Office
  ATO Facebook profile
  ATO Twitter profile
  Taxpayers' Charter

Revenue services
Commonwealth Government agencies of Australia
Taxation in Australia
Taxation Office
Government agencies established in 1910
1910 establishments in Australia